The 143rd Division(2nd formation) was formed in March 1951 in Hunan. 

The division was part of the 48th Corps. 

In March 1952, the division was detached from the corps and transferred to Zhongnan Military Region's control.

In December 1952 the division was inactivated and converted to the 28th Aviation Division.

As of inactivation the division was composed of:
The 427th Regiment;
The 428th Regiment;
The 429th Regiment.

References

中国人民解放军各步兵师沿革，http://blog.sina.com.cn/s/blog_a3f74a990101cp1q.html

Infantry divisions of the People's Liberation Army
Military units and formations established in 1951
Military units and formations disestablished in 1952
1951 establishments in China